Events from the year 2001 in Kuwait.

Incumbents
Emir: Jaber Al-Ahmad Al-Jaber Al-Sabah
Prime Minister: Saad Al-Salim Al-Sabah

Events

Establishments

Fast Telecommunications.

References

 
Kuwait
Kuwait
Years of the 21st century in Kuwait
2000s in Kuwait